WVLK (590 kHz) is an AM radio station serving the Lexington, Kentucky area with a news/talk format. This station is under ownership of Cumulus Media. The station's studios are located inside Kincaid Towers in downtown Lexington, and its transmitter is located in the northwest part of Lexington.

Programming
Weekday programming features local shows during the morning and early afternoon and several syndicated talk radio programs during the late afternoon and evening including Sean Hannity, Geraldo Rivera and Mark Levin. Weekend programming includes local shows on a variety of topics from gardening to home maintenance to sports, as well as syndicated programs like Kim Komando and Clark Howard.

History
Originally licensed to Versailles, WVLK began broadcasting on November 26, 1947, as a Mutual affiliate on 590 kHz with 1 KW power (full-time). It was owned by Bluegrass Broadcasting Company, whose president was former governor and U.S. Senator A.B. Chandler. Offices were originally in Versailles, with an additional office in Lexington. In 1951, the offices and studios were moved to Lexington, first in the Lafayette Hotel, and later, the Phoenix hotel on Main Street in downtown. 

The station ran a longtime Top 40 format for three decades until 1981 when the station's format on music shifted towards middle-of-the-road but would shortly later flip to adult contemporary afterward, running it for more than a decade until dropping in the 1990s. 

From 1968 until sometime in the 1990s, WVLK was the original flagship radio station of the University of Kentucky Wildcats men's basketball and football games from the UK Sports Radio Network. Before that network was established, stations had to produce their own individual broadcasts of Kentucky Wildcats football and basketball games, and WVLK and WLAP were the primary Lexington-area radio outlets for the games before the network began. 

In 2015, WVLK signed on a new FM translator station, W266AN in Lawrenceburg, at 101.1 MHz on the FM dial. On June 20, W266AN was forced off the air due to interference with WSGS in the Central Kentucky area. Effective June 13, 2017, the translator was licensed to Lexington at 97.3 FM, as W247CT. Also on Jan 1, 2020, WVLK is now on WCYN FM 102.3 FM.

Coverage area
The station's AM signal provides at least secondary coverage to most of central Kentucky, as well as parts of the Louisville radio market, and as far south as the Lake Cumberland area.

Early voices
Among the early voices at WVLK, US Representative Harold Rogers was a disc jockey at the station in 1959, while he was a student at the University of Kentucky.

During the period from 1959 through 1963, the DJ 'crew' at WVLK included Arty Kay, Bob McDonald, Jim Chadwick, Sam Combs, Charles Lancaster, Jim Richmond, and Darrel Evans.  At that time, WVLK was a longtime Top 40 station, and was the highest-rated station in the market, with more listeners than all of the other stations combined (Pulse, Hooper, Nielson ratings).  The sportscaster (both HS and UK sports) was Claude Sullivan.<Jim Chadwick>

References

External links
News/Talk 590 WVLK - Official website

News and talk radio stations in the United States
VLK (AM)
Radio stations established in 1947
Cumulus Media radio stations
1947 establishments in Kentucky
Mass media in Lexington, Kentucky